The Los Alamitos Formation is a geological formation of the North Patagonian Massif in Rio Negro Province, northwestern Patagonia, Argentina, whose strata date back to the Late Cretaceous (Late Campanian to Maastrichtian). Dinosaur remains are among the fossils that have been recovered from the formation.

Fossil content

Dinosaurs

Birds

Mammaliaforms

See also 
 List of dinosaur-bearing rock formations

References

Bibliography 
  

 
Geologic formations of Argentina
Cretaceous Argentina
Siltstone formations
Sandstone formations
Lacustrine deposits
Paleontology in Argentina